A raft guide is a trained professional capable of leading commercial while water rafting trips. Most raft guides are employed by commercial outfitters who run either multi or single day trips.

Training
Typically first year raft guides are required to undergo a training program often run by the company or a professional guide training school before beginning to guide commercial trips.  This training utilizes classroom and on-river experience to train students in rigging and maneuvering vessels; river flow and hazards; scouting and running rapids; and river rescue and emergency procedures. Trainees are generally required to have a minimum of Basic First Aid and CPR certifications. Professional river guides often have additional advanced certifications such as International Rafting Federation-GTE, Wilderness First Aid, Wilderness First Responder, Swift Water Rescue, White Water Rescue or Emergency Medical Technician. River rafting is an adventure sport in which expeditions are taken down rivers. Raft guides are also usually required to obtain a food handlers license, as preparing food is a large component of being a guide.

Training may include such skills as:
 Teamwork and leadership skills
 Safety on the river - hand signals
 Boating gear and equipment
 Commercial river operations
 Customer service - safety talks and guide "chatter"
 Whitewater paddling techniques
 River etiquette guidelines
 Problems, emergencies, advanced river rescues
 Knots and riggings
 Natural and the local history of the river
 Meal Preparation

Description
A typical raft guide is usually in his or her twenties, but can range in age from late teens to late sixties. The majority of raft guides are seasonal employees and work during the spring and summer months when rivers are flowing at their best levels.  However during the seasonal winter months, some raft guides will continue to work by traveling to countries with warmer climates where commercial rafting exists.

A raft guide's primary job is to navigate an inflatable raft with passengers (crew) down a river in a safe and enjoyable manner.  This requires that they continually assess and manage risks during the trip.  A skilled raft guide is able to recognize river features and understand their effects on a raft, and what is required to navigate among or around these features with passengers. On rapids where the potential risk of injury is high, it is the guides responsibility to keep the raft from overturning (flipping) or passengers from falling overboard.

An important part of the job is delivering the "Safety Talk".  Before a trip, raft guides brief customers on potential hazards they may face on the water.  Every raft guide has their own delivery style. Some safety talks include a lot of corny jokes (summer teeth) and others explain the dangers of the river in detail (foot entrapment). Most rookie guides will listen to veteran guides' talks and take bits and pieces of each to create their own.  A good safety talk should cover equipment (PFD, paddle, helmet), how to self-rescue in event of a swim, how to pull people back into the boat, and learning hand signals.  Guides will also go over what to do in the event of a flip, wrap, or strainer.  These three main hazards are very important to know in order to stay safe.  Safety talks can also include discussions such as "Leave No Trace", and plants and animals to watch out for.

Types of guiding 
Oar Guiding is where the guide maneuvers the raft with oars from either the stern or middle of the raft. On multi-day trips it is common to have a center oar rig where clients do not paddle, and where gear is stored. Guides oar guiding will use techniques such as 'walking the oars' through flat sections or 'holding a star' when stern rigged through large waves. Oar Guides generally have more control over their raft than paddle guides, but oar rigged rafts are dangerous when flipping and hard to re-right making them less versatile in big water rafting. Oar boats are often rigged to carry all of the gear for a trip.  Oars are typically made of wood, but sometimes plastic.

Paddle Guiding is the most common type of high adventure guiding where the guide sits in the stern of the boat with a one bladed guide stick (paddle). Using draws, prys, the guide can influence the direction of the boat, along with using different paddling commands for their crew. Paddle guiding is the most fun form of rafting.  Guests usually enjoy paddle guiding the most as they feel like they really have control over what is going on in the boat.

Bow Guiding is where two guides are in the boat, one in the stern and one in the bow. This can be done in a stern rigged boat, or a raft where both guides are paddle guiding. It is usually only done over short stretches of whitewater that require a lot of maneuvering for safe passage. Bow guides use techniques such as 'spearing' through large waves, and bow draws to quickly change the direction of the boat. Unlike stern guides the bow guide will never pry with their paddle, instead they will change the orientation of their hands to maintain a power grip in both directions.

Compensation
Guide compensation can vary a great deal by type and length of the trip. In North America guides are typically paid by the day.  They are also known to receive gratuities from their clients and the summation of a trip.

References

External links
 Salary.Com Dream Job: White Water Raft Guide
 Information and Resources for Raft Guides
 New York Times article on Whitewater School

Jobs
Rafting
Guides